Gift Emmanuel Orban (born 17 July 2002) is a Nigerian professional footballer who plays as a striker for Belgian club Gent.

Career

Stabæk
Orban grew up in Togo as well as Nigeria, and speaks French. In November 2021, he was scouted by Stabæk's Torgeir Bjarmann and Thomas Finstad in Nigeria during a showcase tournament arranged by agent Atta Aneke. He trained with Stabæk during the winter of 2022 before returning after his visa expired. Returning to Norway, he signed for Stabæk in late May 2022. The transfer from Nigerian club Bison FC was a loan with an option to buy.

He scored his first goals in cup matches against semi-professional teams Notodden and Gjøvik-Lyn (twice). After this he became a starting player for Stabæk. His goal against SK Brann was compared to Alanzinho's time at Stabæk. VG also called him a "striker jewel".

When Stabæk sold Oliver Valaker Edvardsen in July, the club announced they would spend the money on Orban's buyout option. The contract tying Orban to Stabæk until the end of 2026 was announced on 3 August. He became the top scorer in the 2022 Norwegian First Division with 16 goals, alongside Bård Finne. Helping Stabæk win promotion to 2023 Eliteserien, Orban was also named Young Player of the Year in the First Division.

Gent
On 31 January 2023, Orban joined Belgian Pro League side Gent on a permanent deal. On 11 February, Orban scored two goals on his Pro League debut in a 3–3 draw with Westerlo. On 12 March, Orban managed to score four goals in a 6–2 away win over Zulte Waregem, which made him the first player of Gent to do so in the 21st century. On 15 March, he scored a hat-trick in 4–1 away win over İstanbul Başakşehir in the UEFA Europa Conference League round 16. The hat-trick was scored within three minutes and 25 seconds, setting a new record for the fastest hat-trick in UEFA club competitions, breaking the previous record of six minutes and 12 seconds held by Mohammed Salah in the Champions League.

Career statistics

Honours
Individual
Norwegian First Division top scorer: 2022
Norwegian First Division Young Player of the Year: 2022

References

External links

Profile at Norwegian FA

2002 births
Living people
Nigerian footballers
Association football forwards
Stabæk Fotball players
K.A.A. Gent players
Norwegian First Division players
Nigerian expatriate footballers
Nigerian expatriate sportspeople in Togo
Expatriate footballers in Norway
Nigerian expatriate sportspeople in Norway
Expatriate footballers in Belgium
Nigerian expatriate sportspeople in Belgium